The 1939 South Dakota State Jackrabbits football team was an American football team that represented South Dakota State University in the North Central Conference (NCC) during the 1939 college football season. In its second season under head coach Jack V. Barnes, the team compiled a 7–2 record, tied for the conference championship, and outscored opponents by a total of 141 to 95.

Schedule

References

South Dakota State
South Dakota State Jackrabbits football seasons
North Central Conference football champion seasons
South Dakota State Jackrabbits football